Anna Mei (10 July 1967) is a racing cyclist, mountain biker and a breaker of long-distance (24h) records. She set the women's velodrome record at 441.55 miles (711.04 km), average speed 18.40 mph (29.63 km/h) at the Roberto Battaglia velodrome in Busto Garolfo (Italy) in September 2011.

Palmarès
2009 : Winner 24h MTB World Solo Championship, Age Group Mtb - Canmore, Alberta
2010 : Winner 24h MTB World Solo Championship, Age Group Mtb - Mount Stromlo, Canberra, Australia
2010 : Winner 24h Ultracycling del Montello, Age Group, Italian Championship
2010 : Winner Milano - Sanremo, Age Group

References

1967 births
Italian female cyclists
Living people
Cyclists from Milan